Gaikhur is a village development committee in Gorkha District in the Gandaki Zone of northern-central Nepal. At the time of the 1991 Nepal census it had a population of 4,793 and had 948 houses in the town. Mirkot, Palungtar, Khoplang, Dhuwakot are the neighbouring VDCs of Gaikhur.  Gaikhur lies on the western side of Gorkha Bazar.

It is the birthplace of Hit Raj Pandey, who is a local and development minister under the current government.

References

Populated places in Gorkha District